The 2019–20 season was Alashkert's eighth season in the Armenian Premier League and thirteenth overall. After the season was suspended due to the COVID-19 pandemic in Armenia, Alashkert finished third in the League, reached the quarterfinals of the Armenian Cup and were runners-up in the Armenian Supercup. In Europe Alashkert were knocked out of the Europa League in the second qualifying round by FCSB.

Season events
On 4 September, manager Abraham Khashmanyan was fired, with Armen Adamyan being appointed as the clubs caretaker manager.

On 12 March 2020, the Football Federation of Armenia announced that all Armenian Premier League games had been postponed until 23 March due to the COVID-19 pandemic in Armenia.

On 28 June, Yegishe Melikyan was appointed as manager.

Squad

Transfers

In

Loans in

Released

Friendlies

Competitions

Supercup

Premier League

Regular season

Results summary

Results

Table

Championship round

Results summary

Results

Table

Armenian Cup

UEFA Europa League

Qualifying rounds

Statistics

Appearances and goals

|-
|colspan="16"|Players away on loan:
|-
|colspan="16"|Players who left Alashkert during the season:

|}

Goal scorers

Clean sheets

Disciplinary record

References

FC Alashkert seasons
Alashkert